Norman Patterson is the name of:

Norman Patterson (athlete) (1886–1961), American athlete
Norman Patterson (soccer) (1945–2012), Canadian soccer player

See also
Norman McLeod Paterson (1883–1983), Canadian politician